Cemile Giousouf (born 5 May 1978) is a German politician; she was the first ever Muslim member of the Christian Democratic Union (CDU), serving as Member of the Bundestag for one legislative term from 2013 until 2017.

Early life and education
Giousouf was born on 5 May 1978 in Leverkusen to ethnic Turkish Gastarbeiter parents, who immigrated in the 1970s from Greece, where they lived as a minority in Western Thrace. Soon after her birth, Giousouf was sent back to her uncle in Greece. At the age of two, Giousouf returned to her family in Germany. Giousouf has a brother.

The members of her immigrant family spoke Turkish as well as Greek at home as their native languages, denoting their ethnic ancestry and original nationality, as well as German; they are naturalised and second-generation citizens.

In addition to her German citizenship, Giousouf also holds Greek citizenship.

Following the completion of her high school education in Leverkusen with the Abitur, Giousouf studied political science, social science and Islamic science at the University of Bonn.

Professional career
In 2008, Giousouf was employed as consultant in the State Ministry of Generations, Family, Women and Integration of North Rhine-Westphalia under the leadership of State Minister Armin Laschet. At the ministry, Giousouf was in charge of the "Women with Immigration History" dossier. From 2009, Giousouf served as consultant in the Department of Integration at the Ministry of Integration and Social Welfare of the same state.

Political career
During her university years, Giousouf was active in the German-Turkish Forum, a subordinate organization of the Christian Democratic Union (CDU). In 2008, Giousouf was elected vice chairperson of the organization's North Rhine-Westphalia branch, to which she belonged since 2004. Giousouf was also active in the CDU's several other local organizations as well as in the city administration of Aachen.

 Giousouf entered CDU's federal-level organization in 2011, where she was active on integration matters. On 30 June 2012 Giousouf was elected to the executive board of CDU state organization in North Rhine-Westphalia.

In 2013, the local organization of CDU in Hagen nominated Giousouf for the federal elections. In the next two preliminary inner-party elections, Giousouf was able to make her way for the federal election as direct candidate in the Ennepe-Ruhr-Kreis District in September 2013. Giousouf became the first ever Muslim politician of the CDU to be elected into the Bundestag.

In parliament, Giousouf was a member of the Committee on Education, Research and Technology Assessment. In this capacity, she was her parliamentary group’s rapporteur on state-funded scholarship schemes and the validation of foreign studies and degrees.

Other activities
 Konrad Adenauer Foundation (KAS), Member of the Board of Trustees
 Avicenna-Studienwerk, Member of the Board of Trustees
 Council of Muslim Students and Academics (RAMSA), Member of the Board of Trustees
 Green Helmets, Member of the Board of Trustees
 Internationaler Bund (IB), Member of the Federal Counselling Committee

References

External links
 

1978 births
People from Leverkusen
German politicians of Turkish descent
German people of Greek descent
Greek people of Turkish descent
Living people
University of Bonn alumni
German people of Turkish descent
Female members of the Bundestag
Members of the Bundestag for North Rhine-Westphalia
German feminists
German Muslims
Greek Muslims
21st-century German women politicians
21st-century German civil servants
Members of the Bundestag 2013–2017
Members of the Bundestag for the Christian Democratic Union of Germany